Produce 101 is a reality television talent competition franchise created by South Korean entertainment conglomerate CJ E&M, based around the formation of a K-pop girl group or boy group. The format is noted for having no panel of judges, employing audience participation to make decisions, as well as for starting with a very large number of competitors, 101, narrowing that number down to the final 11. The franchise began in 2016 and has since expanded to other East Asian countries, China and Japan.

The franchise has attracted a wide following in the world. More than 10 million people cast votes during the finale of Season 2 in 2017, equivalent to a fifth of South Korea's population. In 2018, the eight episodes of Produce 101 China attracted more than 4.3 billion views on Tencent Video.

Following the Mnet vote manipulation investigation, on November 14, 2019, producer Ahn Joon-young partially admitted to rigging the votes of all seasons of Produce 101 during police questioning. He was arrested before over allegations of bribery and fraud in the franchise.

Versions

South Korea
 Produce 101, featuring female trainees premiered on January 22, 2016.
 Produce 101 Season 2, featuring male trainees premiered on April 7, 2017.
 Produce 48, featuring female trainees and members of J-pop idol group AKB48 including its sister groups, premiered on June 15, 2018. 
 Produce X 101, featuring male trainees premiered on May 3, 2019.

China
 Produce 101 China, featuring female trainees premiered on April 21, 2018.
 Produce Camp 2019, also known as Chuang 2019 featuring male trainees premiered on April 6, 2019.
 Produce Camp 2020, also known as Chuang 2020 featuring female trainees premiered on May 2, 2020.
 Produce Camp 2021, also known as Chuang 2021 featuring male trainees premiered on February 17, 2021.

Japan
 Produce 101 Japan, featuring male trainees premiered on September 26, 2019.
 Produce 101 Japan Season 2, featuring male trainees premiered on April 8, 2021.

Summary of shows by country
As of June 13, 2021, there have been 10 groups debuted with 107 members involved in over 3 franchises of Produce 101.

 Currently airing
 An upcoming season
 Status unknown
 No longer airing

See also 

 Girls Planet 999, an Mnet survival show featuring female South Korean, Chinese and Japanese trainees.
 Boys Planet, an Mnet survival show featuring male South Korean and Global trainees.

Notes

References

External links
  

 
Korean-language television shows
2016 South Korean television seasons
2017 South Korean television seasons
2016 South Korean television series debuts
2017 South Korean television series debuts
2016 South Korean television series endings
2017 South Korean television series endings
South Korean reality television series
South Korean variety television shows
Mnet (TV channel) original programming
Television series by CJ E&M